Gene Craig Sauers (born August 22, 1962) is an American professional golfer, currently playing on the PGA Tour Champions. He had three wins on the PGA Tour and overcame a deadly skin condition that kept him off the golf course for five years. He won the U.S. Senior Open in 2016, a senior major championship .

Born in Savannah, Georgia, Sauers started him playing golf at the age of nine with his father. He attended Georgia Southern University in Statesboro, turned pro, and joined the PGA Tour in 1984.

Sauers has four dozen top-10 finishes in PGA Tour events including three official wins. His first win was in 1986 at the Bank of Boston Classic; his second came at the 1989 Hawaiian Open; his third, which came after a 13-year hiatus, was in 2002 at the final edition of the Air Canada Championship in British Columbia. He also won the Deposit Guaranty Golf Classic in Mississippi in 1990, opposite the Masters in April, before it was an official money event.

He finished two other tournaments in a tie for first place at the end of regulation: the 1992 Bob Hope Chrysler Classic, which he lost on the fourth extra hole of a playoff to John Cook, and the St. Jude Classic in 1994, which he and Hal Sutton lost to Tour rookie Dicky Pride. After his win in Canada, Sauers received the PGA Comeback Player of the Year award in 2002. His best finish in a major was a tie for second at the PGA Championship in 1992.

Sauers lost his tour card in 1995 and had to play primarily on the Nike Tour until his PGA Tour victory in 2002 with its two-year exemption. He recorded one victory on the Nike Tour at the 1998 Nike South Carolina Classic, and about a dozen top-10 finishes.

Sauers competed on the PGA Tour until 2005. From 2006 to 2010, he did not compete professionally after an initial misdiagnosis of rheumatoid arthritis turned out to be Stevens–Johnson syndrome, and he was given only a 25-percent chance of survival. Over several months, during which he received multiple skin grafts that left visible scarring, he gradually recovered.

Sauers finally overcame the disease and played a limited Nationwide Tour schedule in 2011 and 2012 before making his Champions Tour debut at the Boeing Classic near Seattle in 2012. He earned two top-10 finishes in 2012 and was also inducted into the Georgia Golf Hall of Fame. Playing a full season in 2013, Sauers was twice a runner-up, including a playoff loss to Esteban Toledo at the Insperity Invitational. He finished nineteenth on the Champions Tour money list.

In the first six months of 2014, Sauers played in eleven events, with six top-25 finishes and a best of T-15 at the Allianz Championship in early February. At the U.S. Senior Open in Oklahoma in July, he was tied with Colin Montgomerie after 72 holes but lost in a three-hole playoff.

Two years later in 2016, Sauers earned his first win as a senior at the U.S. Senior Open in Ohio.

Professional wins (9)

PGA Tour wins (3)

*Note: The 1989 Hawaiian Open was shortened to 54 holes due to rain.

PGA Tour playoff record (1–3)

Nike Tour wins (1)

Other wins (4)
1983 Georgia Open
1985 Georgia Open
1986 Georgia Open
1990 Deposit Guaranty Golf Classic

PGA Tour Champions wins (1)
 

PGA Tour Champions playoff record (0–5)

Results in major championships

CUT = missed the half-way cut
"T" = tied

Results in The Players Championship

CUT = missed the halfway cut
"T" indicates a tie for a place

Results in World Golf Championships

Senior major championships

Wins (1)

Results timeline
Results not in chronological order before 2022.

CUT = missed the halfway cut
"T" indicates a tie for a place
NT = No tournament due to COVID-19 pandemic

See also
1983 PGA Tour Qualifying School graduates

References

External links

American male golfers
PGA Tour golfers
PGA Tour Champions golfers
Winners of senior major golf championships
Golfers from Savannah, Georgia
1962 births
Living people